Pascal N'Zonzi (born 1 January 1951) is a French actor and stage director.

Filmography

Theater

Dubbing

References

External links

1951 births
Living people
French male film actors
French male television actors
20th-century French male actors
21st-century French male actors